{{DISPLAYTITLE:C18H22F2N4O}}
The molecular formula C18H22F2N4O (molar mass: 348.39 g/mol) may refer to:

 BMY-14802, a drug with antipsychotic effects
 Efinaconazole, a triazole antifungal